The Sahitya Akademi Awards have been given annually since 1955 by the Sahitya Akademi, India's National Academy of Letters. They are awarded to writers in the various languages of India in recognition of their outstanding contribution to the upliftment of Indian literature. The following list comprises award winners for Kashmiri literature.

Winners

References

External links

Sahitya Akademi Award
Sahitya Akademi Award
 
Kashmiri
Kashmiri poets